Jingxing North railway station is a railway station on the Shitai Passenger Railway, in the People's Republic of China.

Railway stations in Hebei
Stations on the Qingdao–Taiyuan High-Speed Railway